Erandique Airport  is an airstrip serving the town of Erandique in Lempira Department, Honduras.

It has a downslope to the south. There is distant rising terrain west through northeast.

See also

Transport in Honduras
List of airports in Honduras

References

External links
 OpenStreetMap - Erandique
 FallingRain - Erandique Airport
 HERE Maps - Erandique

Airports in Honduras